This is a list of members of the Belgian Chamber of Representatives during the 50th legislature (1 July 1999 – 10 April 2003).

Election results (13 May 1999)

By party

Dutch-speaking

VB (15)

SP (14)

AGALEV (9)

VU (8)

Lists of members of the Chamber of Representatives (Belgium)
1999 in Belgium
2000s in Belgium